The year 1626 in science and technology involved some significant events.

Physiology and medicine
 Posthumous publication of Adriaan van den Spiegel's De formato foetu in Venice with illustrations by Giulio Casserio and including the first observation of milk in female breasts at birth.

Technology
 Cornelius Vermuyden commissioned to drain Hatfield Chase on the Isle of Axholme in Lincolnshire, England.

Births
 February 18 or 19 – Francesco Redi, Italian physician, biologist and poet (died 1697)
 March 1 – Jean-Baptiste de La Quintinie, French horticulturalist (died 1688)
 April 7 – Ole Borch, Danish chemist, physician, grammarian and poet (died 1690)
 approx. date – Pietro Mengoli, Italian mathematician (died 1686)

Deaths
 February 11 – Pietro Cataldi, Italian mathematician (born 1548)
 April 9 – Francis Bacon, English philosopher and a founder of modern scientific research (born 1561)
 April 11 – Marin Getaldić or Ghetaldi, Ragusan politician, mathematician and physicist, contributed to the emergence of new algebra (born 1568)
 April 14 – Gaspare Aselli, Italian anatomist (born c. 1581)
 June 21 – Anselmus Boëtius de Boodt, Flemish-born humanist, priest, physician and mineralogist (born c. 1550)
 October 30 – Willebrord Snellius, Dutch mathematician and physicist who devised the basic law of refraction, known as Snell's law (born 1580)
 December 10 – Edmund Gunter, English mathematician (born 1581)

Unknown date
 Salomon de Caus, French mechanical and hydraulic engineer (born 1576)

References

 
17th century in science
1620s in science